The Council of Valence may refer to several events held at Valence.
 The First Council of Valence held in 374.
 The Second Council of Valence held in 528.
 The Third Council of Valence held in 585.
 The Fourth Council of Valence held in 855.
 The Fifth Council of Valence held in 890.
 The Sixth Council of Valence held in 1100.
 The Seventh Council of Valence held in 1209.

Drôme